Bumpas-Troy House is a historic home located at Greensboro, Guilford County, North Carolina. It was built in 1847, and is a -story, three bay, Greek Revival style brick dwelling.  The front facade features a two-story portico.

It was listed on the National Register of Historic Places in 1977.  It is in the College Hill Historic District.

A bed-and-breakfast inn was operated in the house from 1992 through October 2016.

References

Bed and breakfasts in North Carolina
Houses on the National Register of Historic Places in North Carolina
Greek Revival houses in North Carolina
Houses completed in 1847
Hotels in Greensboro, North Carolina
Houses in Greensboro, North Carolina
National Register of Historic Places in Guilford County, North Carolina
1847 establishments in North Carolina
Historic district contributing properties in North Carolina